Sphecosoma is a genus of moths in the subfamily Arctiinae. The genus was erected by Arthur Gardiner Butler in 1876.

Species
The genus includes the following species:

 Sphecosoma abdominalis Schaus, 1905
 Sphecosoma abnormis Hampson, 1898
 Sphecosoma albipalpe Draudt, 1915
 Sphecosoma alica E. D. Jones, 1914
 Sphecosoma aurantiipes Rothschild, 1911
 Sphecosoma besasa Schaus, 1924
 Sphecosoma cognata Walker, 1856
 Sphecosoma curta Rothschild, 1931
 Sphecosoma deceptrix Hampson, 1898
 Sphecosoma ecuadora H. Druce, 1883
 Sphecosoma flaveolum Rothschild, 1931
 Sphecosoma gracilis Jörgensen, 1932
 Sphecosoma linda E. D. Jones, 1914
 Sphecosoma mathani Rothschild, 1911
 Sphecosoma matta E. D. Jones, 1914
 Sphecosoma meerkatzi Strand, 1915
 Sphecosoma melanota Hampson, 1898
 Sphecosoma melapera Dognin, 1909
 Sphecosoma melissa Schaus, 1896
 Sphecosoma melissina Kaye
 Sphecosoma meridionale Schrottky, 1910
 Sphecosoma metamela Hampson, 1905
 Sphecosoma nigriceps Hampson, 1903
 Sphecosoma perconstrictum Zerny, 1912
 Sphecosoma plumbicincta Draudt, 1915
 Sphecosoma roseipuncta Schaus, 1920
 Sphecosoma rufipes Rothschild, 1911
 Sphecosoma semelina E. D. Jones, 1914
 Sphecosoma simile Schaus, 1894
 Sphecosoma sparta H. Druce, 1900
 Sphecosoma surrentum H. Druce, 1883
 Sphecosoma testacea Walker, 1854
 Sphecosoma trinitatis Rothschild, 1911
 Sphecosoma vicinum Schrottky, 1910

Former species
 Sphecosoma angustata Möschler, 1878
 Sphecosoma arctatum (Walker, [1865])

References

 
Euchromiina
Moth genera